Soyuz TMA-4 was a Soyuz mission to the International Space Station (ISS)  launched by a Soyuz FG launch vehicle. It was launched on April 19, 2004 (UTC) from Baikonur Cosmodrome. Gennady Padalka from Russia, Michael Fincke from the US and André Kuipers from the Netherlands were flown to the International Space Station. Kuipers returned to Earth 9 days later together with ISS crew 8 with the re-entry module of the Soyuz TMA-3, the other two stayed as ISS crew 9. The craft landed October 24, 2004 with Padalka, Fincke and Yuri Shargin aboard.

Crew

Original Crew

Mission parameters
Mass: ? kg
Perigee: 200 km
Apogee: 252 km
Inclination: 51.7°
Period: 88.7 minutes

Docking with ISS
Docked to ISS: April 21, 2004, 05:01 UTC (to nadir port of Zarya)
Undocked from ISS: October 23, 2004, 21:08 UTC (from nadir port of Zarya)

Mission highlights

Soyuz TMA-4 is a Russian passenger spacecraft that was launched by a Soyuz-FG rocket from Baikonur at 03:19 UT on April 19, 2004. It carried three astronauts (a Russian, an American and a Dutchman) to the International Space Station (ISS) and docked with the Zarya module of the ISS automatically on April 21 at 05:01 UT. Two of its astronauts remained in the ISS for about six months, while the Dutch astronaut and the two astronauts who had inhabited the ISS for several months left the ISS on April 29 in the TMA-3 that had remained docked with the ISS, soft landing in Kazakhstan at 00:11 on April 30.

The Expedition 10 crew, Leroy Chiao-Cdr U.S.A. and Salizhan Sharipov-Russia replaced the Expedition 9 crew, Gennady Padalka-Cdr Russia and Michael Fincke-Flight Engineer-U.S.A. on October 16, 2004.

References 

Crewed Soyuz missions
Spacecraft launched in 2004
Spacecraft which reentered in 2004
Spacecraft launched by Soyuz-FG rockets